"Heatstroke" is a song by Scottish DJ and record producer Calvin Harris featuring American musicians Young Thug, Pharrell Williams, and Ariana Grande. It is the second single from Harris's fifth studio album, Funk Wav Bounces Vol. 1 (2017). It was released on 31 March 2017 through Sony Music, following "Slide".

Composition
The song was written by Calvin Harris, Young Thug, Ariana Grande, Pharrell Williams, Brittany Hazzard, Robin Hannibal, and Cecilie Karshøj. Initially Hannibal and Karshøj of Danish duo Quadron were not credited as co-writers. According to Karshøj, Quadron wrote the demo version of "Heatstroke" with Pharrell Williams in 2012, but when Pharrell Williams released the song with Calvin Harris in March 2017, Hannibal and Karshøj were uncredited as co-writers. Karshøj alleges that she has a video recording of herself recording the demo vocals for "Heatstroke", which were later re-recorded by Ariana Grande. Karshøj has said that the duo receives 15 percent of the song's royalties.

Musically, "Heatstroke" combines hip hop and dance music. news.com.au described the song as a "sun-kissed disco funk delight."

Track listings

Credits and personnel
Calvin Harris – production, Ibanez 1200 Bass, Linn LM-2, 1976 Yamaha UX Ebony Piano, Gibson SG Custom, 1965 Fender Stratocaster, Flexitone, Wurlitzer Electric Piano, Roland Jupiter-8, mixing
Young Thug – vocals
Pharrell Williams – additional vocal production, vocals, Fender Rhodes, additional percussion
Ariana Grande – vocals
Starrah – additional background vocals
Andrew Coleman – recording
Marcos Tovar – recording
Matthew Desrameaux – recording assistance
Dave Kutch – mastering

Charts

Weekly charts

Year-end charts

Certifications

Release history

References

External links
 

2017 singles
2017 songs
Ariana Grande songs
Calvin Harris songs
Songs written by Calvin Harris
Songs written by Pharrell Williams
Songs written by Starrah
Songs written by Young Thug
Songs written by Robin Hannibal